Poverty in Romania is a widespread phenomenon.

The Romanian government defines "poverty" as an income less than 60% of the national median. In 2017, 23.6% of the population or 4.6 million people were affected. By age, the number varies from 32.2% (0-17) to 19.2% (50-64). Nord-Est and Sud-Vest (33.4%) are the poorest development regions, while București - Ilfov (6.1%) the least poor.

In 2014, 70% of the Roma minority lived at risk of poverty.

Notes

References
 National Institute of Statistics, "Dimensiuni ale incluziunii sociale în România, în anul 2017", Bucharest, 2018